Gavmishan may refer to:
 Gavmishan, Fars
 Gavmishan, Bukan, West Azerbaijan Province
 Gavmishan, Mahabad, West Azerbaijan Province